A boomtown is a community that undergoes sudden and rapid population and economic growth, or that is started from scratch. The growth is normally attributed to the nearby discovery of a precious resource such as gold, silver, or oil, although the term can also be applied to communities growing very rapidly for different reasons, such as a proximity to a major metropolitan area, huge construction project, or attractive climate.

First boomtowns

Early boomtowns, such as Leeds, Liverpool, and Manchester, experienced a dramatic surge in population and economic activity during the Industrial Revolution at the turn of the 19th century. In pre-industrial England these towns had been relative backwaters, compared to the more important market towns of Bristol, Norwich, and York, but they soon became major urban and industrial centres. Although these boomtowns did not directly owe their sudden growth to the discovery of a local natural resource, the factories were set up there to take advantage of the excellent Midlands infrastructure and the availability of large seams of cheap coal for fuel.

Another typical boom town is Trieste in Italy. In the 19th century the free port and the opening of the Suez Canal began an extremely strong economic development. At the beginning of the First World War, the former fishing village with a deep-water port, which used to be small but geographically centrally located, was the third largest city of the Habsburg monarchy. Due to the many new borders, World War II and the Cold War, the city was completely isolated, abandoned and shrunk for a long time. The handling of goods in the port and property prices fell sharply. Only when the surrounding countries joined the EU did Trieste return to the economic center of Europe.

In the mid-19th century, boomtowns that were based on natural resources began to proliferate as companies and individuals discovered new mining prospects across the world. The California Gold Rush of the Western United States stimulated numerous boomtowns in that period, as settlements seemed to spring up overnight in the river valleys, mountains, and deserts around what was thought to be valuable gold mining country. In the late 19th and early 20th centuries, boomtowns called mill towns would quickly arise due to sudden expansions in the timber industry; they tended to last the decade or so it took to clearcut nearby forests. Modern-day examples of resource-generated boomtowns include Fort McMurray in Canada, as the extraction of nearby oilsands requires a vast number of workers, and Johannesburg in South Africa, based on the gold and diamond trade.

Attributes
Boomtowns are typically characterized as "overnight expansions" in both population and money, as people stream into the community for mining prospects, high-paying jobs, attractive amenities or climate, or other opportunities. Typically, newcomers are drawn by high salaries or the prospect of "striking it rich" in mining; meanwhile, numerous indirect businesses develop to cater to workers often eager to spend their large paychecks. Often, boomtowns are the site of both economic prosperity and social disruption, as the local culture and infrastructure, if any, struggles to accommodate the waves of new residents. General problems associated with this fast growth can include: doctor shortages, inadequate medical and/or educational facilities, housing shortages, sewage disposal problems, and a lack of recreational activities for new residents.

The University of Denver separates problems associated with a mining-specific boomtown into three categories: 
deteriorating quality of life, as growth in basic industry outruns the local service sector's ability to provide housing, health services, schooling, and retail
declining industrial productivity in mining because of labor turnover, labor shortages, and declining productivity
an underserving by the local service sector in goods and services because capital investment in this sector does not build up adequately

The initial increasing population in Perth, Western Australia, Australia (considered to be a modern-day boomtown) gave rise to overcrowding of residential accommodation as well as squatter populations. "The real future of Perth is not in Perth's hands but in Melbourne (and London) where Rio Tinto and BHP Billiton run their organizations", indicating that some boomtowns' growth and sustainability are controlled by an outside entity.

Boomtowns are typically extremely dependent on the single activity or resource that is causing the boom (e.g., one or more nearby mines, mills, or resorts), and when the resources are depleted or the resource economy undergoes a "bust" (e.g., catastrophic resource price collapse), boomtowns can often decrease in size as fast as they initially grew. Sometimes, all or nearly the entire population can desert the town, resulting in a ghost town.

This can also take place on a planned basis. Since the late 20th century, mining companies have developed temporary communities to service a mine-site, building all the accommodation shops and services, using prefabricated housing or other buildings, making dormitories out of shipping containers, and removed all such structures as the resource was worked out.

Examples

Australia

 Ararat (1850s Victorian Gold Rush)
 Ballarat (1850s–1880s Victorian Gold Rush)
 Bathurst (1850s Australian gold rushes)
 Bendigo (1850s–1880s Victorian Gold Rush)
 Broken Hill (1880s silver–lead–zinc boom)
 Castlemaine (1850s Victorian Gold Rush)
 Charters Towers (1870s gold rush)
 Gold Coast (1980s–2000s due to internal Australian migration trends)
 Kalgoorlie (1890s gold rush)
 Melbourne (1850s–1880s Victorian Gold Rush and associated speculative "land boom")
 Perth

Brazil
 Altamira, Pará
 Balsas, Maranhão
 Brasília, Federal District, development of capital
 Goiânia, Goiás
 Laranjal do Jari, Amapá
 Luís Eduardo Magalhães, Bahia
 Ouro Preto, Minas Gerais (Ouro Preto Gold Rush)
 Palmas, Tocantins
 Parauapebas, Pará
 Rondonópolis, Mato Grosso
 Serra Pelada District, Curionópolis, Pará (Serra Pelada Gold Rush)
 Sinop, Mato Grosso
 Sorriso, Mato Grosso
 Tucuruí, Pará
 São Paulo, São Paulo

Canada
 Calgary, Alberta (during the 1970s oil boom in the province of Alberta)
 Dawson City, Yukon (Klondike Gold Rush)
 Edmonton, Alberta
 Elliot Lake, Ontario
 Estevan, Saskatchewan
 Faro, Yukon
 Fisherville, British Columbia (gold rush boom town of 1864–1865)
 Barkerville, British Columbia
 Fort McMurray, Alberta, oil
 Greater Sudbury, Ontario
Halifax, Nova Scotia, as a port city during the First World War, prior to The Halifax Explosion 
 Kirkland Lake, Ontario
 Oil Springs, Ontario
 Petrolia, Ontario
 Sept-Îles, a city in the Côte-Nord region of eastern Québec, Canada
 Shawinigan, Quebec
 Sydney, Nova Scotia
 Yellowknife, Northwest Territory

United Kingdom
 Aberdeen, North Sea oil boom, known as the "oil capital of Europe"
 Barrow-in-Furness, late 19th and early 20th centuries as the world's largest steelworks and major shipyard
 Belfast, Northern Ireland, fastest-growing settlement in the British Isles in the 19th century due to industry and its port
 Consett,
 Jarrow,
 Leeds,
 Liverpool, industry and shipping, emigrants
 Manchester, rapid economic growth in the early 19th century
 Preston, Lancashire, the boomtown of the Industrial Revolution
 Winster, Derbyshire, England (17th century lead mining community)

United States  

 Anderson, Indiana, automotive industry
 Atlanta, Georgia (rapidly rebuilt and became a commercial center in the years following the Civil War)
 Atlantic City, New Jersey resort boomtown, 1870–1940
 Basic City, Virginia, railroads and mining, 1880s–1900s
 Beaumont, Texas, oil
 Belleville, California, gold-mining boomtown, 1860–1870
 Birmingham, Alabama, coal and iron ore, 1880s
 Bodie, California
 Borger, Texas
 Buffalo, New York, shipping via Erie Canal, steel production, 1825–1890
 Burkburnett, Texas
 Butte, Montana, copper and other resources
 Caldwell, Kansas
 Cement, California, 19021927
 Central City, Colorado
 Chicago, Illinois, railroads, commodity resources, business
 Cincinnati, Ohio, trade, shipping
 Colstrip, Montana
 Columbia, California
 Cripple Creek, Colorado
 Deadwood, South Dakota
 Denver, Colorado
 Detroit, Michigan rise of the automobile industry, 1910–1950
 Dodge City, Kansas
 El Paso, Texas
 Elkhart, Indiana recreational vehicle and manufactured housing industry
 Ellsworth, Kansas
 Endicott, New York (shoe manufacturing boomtown, 1900s–1920s)
 Fairbanks, Alaska, during the Klondike Gold Rush and the building of the Trans-Alaska Pipeline
 Gary, Indiana, steel
 Gillette, Wyoming
 Goldfield, Nevada
 Graysonia, Arkansas
 Guthrie, Oklahoma, oil
 Hancock, Michigan
 Harrisburg, Illinois
 Holyoke, Massachusetts, paper, silk and wool textiles, 1860–1914
 Houghton, Michigan
 Humble, Texas
Idaho City, Idaho, gold rush, 1860s
 Jeffrey City, Wyoming
 Kilgore, Texas
 La Paz, Arizona, gold-mining boomtown, 1862–1864
 Leadville, Colorado
 Minneapolis, Minnesota Lumber Industry 1852–1880
 Newport, Wisconsin, sprang up because of a bridge expected to be built across the Wisconsin River there
 New Bedford, Massachusetts, whaling
 Nome, Alaska
 Odessa, Texas, oil
 Pittsburgh, Pennsylvania, steel, trade
Pocatello, Idaho, railroad, 1870s–1920s
 Richland, Washington
 Rochester, New York, starting in the 1820s, with the opening of the Erie Canal
 Sacramento, California
 St. Joseph, Florida
 San Francisco, California, US settlement after winning Mexican War
 Salt Lake City, Utah
 San Luis, Arizona
 Seattle, Washington, became a prosperous port city during the Klondike Gold Rush in 1897 subsequently after its great fire which also brought in an influx of jobs and newcomers
 Sioux City, Iowa
 Tombstone, Arizona
 Texarkana, TX/AR
 Virginia City, Nevada, silver-mining boomtown, 1860s
 Wenatchee, Washington and other towns in the area are currently undergoing massive electrical infrastructure growth to support bitcoin mining due to the cheap local electricity
 Wentzville, Missouri
 Williston, North Dakota, oil

Others
 Batam, Indonesia, free trade
 Carbonia, Italy
 Dubai, UAE, oil
 Dublin, Ireland
 Dunedin, New Zealand due to the 1860s Gold Rush
 Bangalore, India–  due to outsourcing of call centers and the IT industry
 Hyderabad, India–  due to outsourcing of call centers and the IT industry
 New Town, Kolkata–  due to growth of IT industry
 Johannesburg, South Africa
 Karachi, Pakistan
 Kimberley, South Africa, diamonds and gold
 Leipzig, Germany
 Monterrey, Nuevo León, Mexico, industrialization due to metallurgic and brewing industries and their related supply chains
 Nizhnevartovsk, Russia, oil
 Novosibirsk, Russia, planned development as a scientific and industrial center; hosted evacuated population and industry during World War II
 Roubaix, France
 Shenzhen, China

See also
Yellowcake boomtown
Zoom town

References

External links

Economic growth
Types of towns
Urban studies and planning terminology
Boom towns are usually established in 5-12 years